The SJ-1 Head Skinner was a single-seat, gull-wing sports plane built in the US by brothers Earl and Jerry Adkisson of Tuscola, Illinois in 1957.

Design and development

Earl ("Skeezix") and Jerry Adkisson, two brothers at Tuscola airport, joined the Experimental Aircraft Association (EAA) in 1955 and began gathering material for their construction project in the Autumn of that year.  Their aircraft would be patterned after the P.Z.L. P.24, a popular Polish gull-winged fighter aircraft of World War II.

Using wings from a 1946 Luscombe 8, cut and re-formed into the gull-wing configuration, the cabin and forward fuselage section were formed of steel tubes.  A Luscombe tailcone was attached to the aft end of the steel-tube frame, and standard Luscombe tail surfaces were adapted, with their tips squared off.  The spring-steel main landing gear was taken from a Cessna.  The planned engine was a  Warner radial engine, but settled for a  Continental A65 driving a Beech-Robey controllable propeller in the initial installation.

Specifications (SJ-1 Head Skinner)

Notes

References

1950s United States sport aircraft
Single-engined tractor aircraft
Gull-wing aircraft
High-wing aircraft
Aircraft first flown in 1957